Rupert III ‘the Bellicose’ of Nassau,  (died 23/28 December 1191), was one of the earliest counts of Nassau. He was not without significance for his country. Important government decisions characterize him, but much more important is his more general political activity, making him one of the most striking princes of the House of Nassau. He took part in the Third Crusade.

Life

Rupert was probably a son of count Arnold II of Laurenburg and a woman of unknown name.

Rupert is mentioned as count of Nassau between 1160 and 1190. He ruled together with his cousin Henry I and later with his cousin Walram I.

Rupert was one of the trusted councilors of Emperor Frederick I Barbarossa, in whose surroundings we usually find him. In 1161 and 1162 he was with the emperor at Milan; whether he participated in the further trips to Italy in the years 1166 and 1167 remains questionable; likewise, participation in the unfortunate journey of 1174-1176 is, although likely, not traceable. It is also believed that he was present at the Diet of Pentecost at Mainz.

In 1172 Rupert became Vogt of Schönau Abbey and was since 1182 Vogt of Koblenz. He is called Ruoberdus comes in the inscription of a coin, which names Siegen as civitas, dated around 1175.

With his cousin Walram, Rupert joined the Third Crusade (1189-1190), and in 1190 commanded the fourth army troop. He was assigned an important task at the start of the journey. Together with his cousin Walram and Count Henry of Diez, he formed the accompaniment of Bishop Herman II of Münster, who was envoy to Byzantine Emperor Isaac II Angelos in the fall of 1188. The delegation did arrive in Constantinople, but was treated badly by the Byzantine Emperor and imprisoned in poor conditions. They were set free as the crusade army approached. On October 28, 1189, Rupert and his companions rejoined the crusade army at Philippopolis. Nothing is known with certainty about his further participation in the crusade; it seems that he stayed until the end of the siege of Akko and then died on the way back at sea. He was succeeded by his son Herman.

Marriage and children
Rupert possibly married firstly to a daughter of William, Count of Gießen.

Rupert married in or before 1169 to Elizabeth of Leiningen (died 20 June 1235/38), daughter of Emicho III, Count of Leiningen. As widow she used the title countess of Schowenburg.
From this union came two children:
 Herman (died 16 July before 1206), count of Nassau 1190–1192.
 Lucardis (died before 1222), she married before 27 February 1204 to Herman III, Count of Virneburg († after 1254).

Footnotes

References

Sources

External links
 Family tree of the House of Nassau
 Nassau in: Medieval Lands. A prosopography of medieval European noble and royal families
 Palatinate in: Medieval Lands. A prosopography of medieval European noble and royal families

Christians of the Third Crusade
Counts of Nassau
12th-century people of the Holy Roman Empire
1191 deaths
Year of birth unknown